Seyyed Bar (also Romanized as Seyyed Bār; also known as Seyyed Bārān) is a village in Polan Rural District, Polan District, Chabahar County, Sistan and Baluchestan Province, Iran. At the 2006 census, its population was 84, in 16 families.

References 

Populated places in Chabahar County